VIPER may refer to:

Science and technology
 Video Identification Parade Electronic Recording (VIPER), a British system for conducting digital identity parades
 VIPER microprocessor, a microprocessor designed by the Royal Signals and Radar Establishment
 VIPER (rover), a planned NASA lunar rover
 One of the programming languages used in Ethereum
 A superconducting cable designed by Commonwealth Fusion Systems

Other uses
 VIPERs, exchange-traded funds issued by The Vanguard Group
 VIPeR, a military robot

See also
 Viper (disambiguation)
 VIPIR (disambiguation)